Charles Hamlin (March 28, 1947 – May 23, 2021) was an American rower. He competed in the men's coxless four event at the 1968 Summer Olympics.  He graduated from Harvard University and Harvard Business School.

References

External links
 

1947 births
2021 deaths
American male rowers
Olympic rowers of the United States
Rowers at the 1968 Summer Olympics
People from Northampton, Massachusetts
Harvard Crimson rowers
Harvard Business School alumni